The Men's 110 metres hurdles at the 1978 European Athletics Championships was held in Prague, then Czechoslovakia, at Stadion Evžena Rošického on 1st, 2nd, and 3 September in 1978.

Medalists

Results

Final
3 September
Wind: -0.5 m/s

Semi-finals
2 September

Semi-final 1
Wind: -0.4 m/s

Semi-final 2
Wind: 0 m/s

Heats
1 September

Heat 1
Wind: 0.7 m/s

Heat 2
Wind: -0.3 m/s

Heat 3
Wind: 0 m/s

Participation
According to an unofficial count, 19 athletes from 11 countries participated in the event.

 (1)
 (3)
 (1)
 (1)
 (1)
 (2)
 (3)
 (2)
 (2)
 (1)
 (2)

References

110 metres hurdles
Sprint hurdles at the European Athletics Championships